Sophisticated Beggar is English folk / rock singer-songwriter and guitarist Roy Harper's debut album. It was released in 1966.

History
The album consists of Harper's poetry backed by acoustic guitar and recorded with a Revox tape machine by Pierre Tubbs.  Tubbs was also the producer of the album, under the pseudonym Peter Richards.

When initially released the album was poorly distributed; only a few thousand were ever made, so to promote the album, Harper designed flyers and personally handed them out to shoppers in Oxford Street, London. The album's liner notes imply that both John Renbourn and Ritchie Blackmore contributed.

On the original vinyl release, after the record needle pans across the run-out groove to the lock groove, there is a recording of Harper saying "Hup hup" over and over again. Some subsequent CD releases have included this recording as a separate track, "Hup Hup Spiral".

The album has subsequently been re-released on a number of different labels, given numerous titles, and had the original track listing altered. Though still available today, Harper only receives royalties for the official Science Friction release.

Album cover
The album cover was drawn by Lon Goddard who, at the time, was the barman at Les Cousins. Goddard also lived with Harper and his family in Kilburn, London, played 2nd guitar on "October Twelfth" and "Goldfish" and later designed the gatefold cover for Harper's 1970 Harvest release, Flat Baroque and Berserk.

Track listing

Release history

Personnel

 Bert Jansch
 John Renbourn
 Paul Brett
 Lon Goddard

References

External links
 Roy Harper official site
 Excellent Roy Harper resource
 The Stormcock Community fan site

1966 debut albums
Roy Harper (singer) albums
Science Friction albums